This is a list of electoral results for the electoral district of Mundingburra in Queensland state elections.

Members for Mundingburra

Election results

Elections in the 2020s

Elections in the 2010s

Elections in the 2000s

Elections in the 1990s

Elections in the 1950s

Elections in the 1940s 

 Preferences were not distributed.

Elections in the 1930s 

 Preferences were not distributed.

 Preferences were not distributed.

Elections in the 1920s

Elections in the 1910s

References

Queensland state electoral results by district